Tretanorhinus is a genus of snakes in the subfamily Dipsadinae of the family Colubridae.

Geographic range
The genus Tretanorhinus is endemic to Central America, northern South America, and the West Indies.

Species
The genus contains the following four species which are recognized as being valid.
Tretanorhinus mocquardi 
Tretanorhinus nigroluteus 
Tretanorhinus taeniatus 
Tretanorhinus variabilis 

The specific name, mocquardi, is in honor of French herpetologist François Mocquard.

Reproduction
All species in the genus Tretanorhinus are oviparous.

References

Further reading
Duméril A-M-C, Bibron G, Duméril A[-H-A] (1854). Erpétologie générale ou histoire naturelle complète des reptiles. Tome septième [Volume 7]. Première partie. Comprenant l'histoire des serpents non venimeux. Paris: Roret. xvi + 780 pp. (Tretanorhinus, new genus, pp. 348–349; T. variabilis, new species, pp. 349–351). (in French).

Dipsadinae
Snake genera
Taxa named by André Marie Constant Duméril
Taxa named by Gabriel Bibron
Taxa named by Auguste Duméril